Thomas Nilsson (born 2 August 1955) is a former Swedish football player.

During his club career, Sandberg played for IK Brage and Karlstad BK.

Sandberg made 13 appearances for the Sweden national football team from 1980 to 1982, scoring 1 goal.

External links
 

1955 births
Swedish footballers
Sweden international footballers
IK Brage players
Karlstad BK players
Association football forwards
People from Borlänge Municipality
Living people
Sportspeople from Dalarna County